The Jockey Club Oaks Invitational Stakes is an American Grade III stakes race Thoroughbred horse race for three-year-old fillies run over a distance of one and three-eighth miles on the turf held annually in September at Belmont Park, Elmont, New York.  The purse for the event is US$700,000.

History 
In 2019 the New York Racing Association with the influx of racino dollars created a new racing series for three-year-old fillies called the Turf Tiara. The Jockey Club Oaks Invitational Stakes was positioned as the third and last leg of the new three race series held over the long distance of  miles with an impressive purse of US$700,000. The other events of the Turf Tiara are the Belmont Oaks at Belmont Park held in July and the Saratoga Oaks Invitational Stakes at Saratoga held in August. The event is run on the same day as the Jockey Club Derby Invitational Stakes which is the final leg of the Turf Trinity, an analogous series for three-year-old colts and geldings. 

The inaugural running on 8 September 2019 was won by His Highness The Aga Khan's Edisa. Edisa was sired by the American Champion Kitten's Joy in Kentucky but made her first six starts in France and placed second in both the Group 2 Prix de Malleret and Group 3 Prix de Psyche.

In 2020 due to the COVID-19 pandemic in the United States, NYRA did not schedule the event in their updated and reformatted fall meeting.

In the 2021 renewal of the event six fillies entered with the first four finishers being Irish-bred. The winner, Shantisara had previously won at Arlington Park in the Grade 3 Pucker Up Stakes and in her next start won the Grade 1 Queen Elizabeth II Challenge Cup Stakes at Keeneland.

With the outstanding quality the event displayed, the American Graded Stakes Committee in 2022 upgraded the classification of the event to Grade III. Also the event in 2022 was moved to Aqueduct Racetrack due to infield tunnel and redevelopment work at Belmont Park. The event was held on the inner turf track and the winner, the British-bred McKulick set a new track record of 2:12.38.

Records
Speed record:
 miles: 2:12.38 –  McKulick (GB) (2022) (new track record at Aqueduct)

Margins:
 length – Edisa (2019)

Most wins by an owner:
 No owner has won the event more than once

Most wins by a jockey:
2 – Flavien Prat (2019, 2021)

Most wins by a trainer:
 2 – Chad C. Brown (2021, 2022)

Winners 

Legend:

See also
 List of American and Canadian Graded races
 Jockey Club Derby Invitational Stakes

References

Graded stakes races in the United States
Grade 3 stakes races in the United States
2019 establishments in New York (state)
Horse races in New York (state)
Turf races in the United States
Recurring sporting events established in 2019
Belmont Park
Flat horse races for three-year-old fillies